is a railway station in the city of Gujō, Gifu Prefecture, Japan, operated by the third sector railway operator Nagaragawa Railway.

Lines

Station layout
Hakusan-Nagataki Station has a one ground-level side platform serving a single bi-directional track.  There is no station building, and the station is unattended.

Adjacent stations

|-
!colspan=5|Nagaragawa Railway

History
Hakusan-Nagataki Station was opened on August 6, 1988.

Surrounding area
Nagataki-Hakusan Jinja
Nagara River

See also
 List of Railway Stations in Japan

References

External links

 

Railway stations in Japan opened in 1988
Railway stations in Gifu Prefecture
Stations of Nagaragawa Railway
Gujō, Gifu